Eagle in the Snow is a 1970 historical fiction novel, written by Wallace Breem, which revolves around the Roman general Paulinus Gaius Maximus, a Mithraic in an age of Christianization, in Britannia and Germania, between the late 4th century and the early 5th century.

Plot summary
During the waning days of the Roman Empire, commander Maximus and his friend Quintus have been commanding the defence of Hadrian's Wall against the Picts and other tribes, who unite  under the guidance of Maximus's archenemy, when the news of an impending Germanic invasion across the Rhine breaks.

After being promoted to 'General of the West' and his wife's death, Maximus is sent to Moguntiacum (modern-day Mainz in Germany) where he is assigned to defend the entire 820-mile border between Gaul and Germania with just one legion, the XX.

Realising the near impossible task, Maximus decides that he and his legion of 6,000 men can succeed by laying out a series of military forts along the west bank of the Rhine to prevent six Germanic nations – 250,000 people – from invading Gaul. After the crossing of the Rhine by a mixed group of Barbarians that included Vandals, Alans, and Suebi, Maximus gains an unlikely ally in Goar, who led a band of Alans into Gaul and then quickly joined the Romans.

As Maximus carries out his duties on the border, he battles against a corrupt bureaucracy in the Roman Empire that denies every request he makes that could assist his Rhine campaign.

He also, under the growing pressures from his allies—including his former enemies— who want him to seize the Western Emperorship for himself, finds himself fighting for a dying empire against Christianity that condemns his traditional pagan beliefs.

1970 British novels
Theodosian dynasty
Novels set in Roman Britain
Novels set in Roman Gaul
British historical novels
War novels set in the Roman Empire
Novels set in the 4th century
Novels set in the 5th century
Mithraism